Sugar Creek is a stream in St. Louis County in the U.S. state of Missouri. It is a tributary of the Mississippi River.

Sugar Creek was so named on account of sugar maple trees near its course.

See also
List of rivers of Missouri

References

Rivers of St. Louis County, Missouri
Rivers of Missouri